Silvio Samuel (born August 3, 1975 in Nigeria) is an IFBB professional bodybuilder.

Biography
Silvio Samuel is an IFBB professional bodybuilder, that represent Spain. who went from amateur to an outstanding world best bodybuilder, with many interesting competitions and winning career. He was discovered by Coach Alfonso Gomez Plaza, from been a young Olympic weightlifter with much potential and energy good enough to be a stand-out bodybuilder, and it turn out to true. Silvio originated from Nigeria, to a larger family members of two boys and six sisters. He left Nigeria due to the political and nationwide instability which killed some of his family members. Growing up traveling all over the world still with the passion in sports it was a life-saving career for him and his family. Ten years career in Olympic Weightlifting, and joining the amateur bodybuilding winning it all Internationally, for five years consecutively, he turn professional after winning the Joe Weider competition in France, that actually gave Silvio his professional license in 2006, while allowed him to pursue his dream career and becoming one of the world top IFBB professional bodybuilder.
His career suffered a blow when a gender event occurred with his partner, reason why he left the high-level competitions for a while.

Contest history
World Championships 2002 - NAC, Medium, 1st
World Championships 2002 - NAC, Overall Winner
Universe 2003 - NAC, Medium, 1st
Universe 2003 - NAC, Overall Winner
World Championships - NAC, Medium, 1st
World Championships - NAC, Overall Winner
World Championships - WABBA, Short, 1st
 PROFESSIONAL CAREER OF SILVIO SAMUEL THE LIST OF WINS AND PLACING.***
New York Pro Show IFBB 2006 14th
Europa Super Show IFBB 2006. 6th
Ironman Pro IFBB 2007, 4th
Sacramento Pro IFBB 2007. 2nd
1st 210 Class IFBB show Dallas, TX. 2007 1st*
Europa Super Show IFBB, Dallas, TX.2007 1st* 
Arnold Classic, Pro IFBB 2007. 5th
New York Pro Show IFBB 2007. 5th
Mr Olympia 2007, 7th
Houston Pro Show IFBB. 2008. 1st*
Arnold Classic Pro IFBB 2008. 5th
Mr. Olympia 2008, 7th
Iron Man Pro Show, IFBB.2009, 1st*
Arnold Classic, Pro IFBB.2009. 5th
Mr. Olympia 2009, 12th (tie)

See also
List of male professional bodybuilders
List of female professional bodybuilders

References

1975 births
Living people
Professional bodybuilders
Nigerian bodybuilders